George "Gee Gee" Gravar Brown (born 17 January 1880) was a footballer who played in the Football League. Born in Kirkley in Suffolk, England he started his career with his home town club Kirkley before spells at Dulwich Hamlet and Woolwich Arsenal. He joined Stoke City in 1903 where he turned professional, before moving to Norwich City, Millwall Athletic, Gainsborough Trinity and finally Sheffield United.

Playing career
Brown began his football career as an amateur with his home town club of Kirkley some time around the end of the Nineteenth Century before moving to London to join another amateur side Dulwich Hamlet. In 1903 he joined Woolwich Arsenal but failed to make an appearance before moving north to sign for Stoke a year later.

Brown made his Football League debut whilst at Stoke, in a home fixture against Derby County on 1 September 1904. He made eight league appearances in total whilst at Stoke before moving to Norwich City in 1905. Having made nineteen league appearances for Norwich, scoring one goal, he returned to London to sign for Millwall Athletic in 1906. Having made 25 league appearances for Millwall, Brown returned north the following season to sign for Lincolnshire side Gainsborough Trinity.

After making 18 league appearances for Trinity, Brown was transferred to Sheffield United as a make-weight in the deal that took fellow Trinity player Joe Kitchen to Bramall Lane in March 1908, the pair moving for a combined fee of £600. Brown's United career got off to a poor start as he was late arriving for his debut game, an away fixture at Sunderland, having missed his rail connection at York and had to take to the field two minutes into the game. Signed on the basis of being a "fast and tricky" winger, he failed to impress, with the local media claiming that he 'held onto the ball too long', and he made only one more league appearance for the Blades before being released at the end of the 1908–09 season.

Personal life
After his football career finished it was reported in 1925 that Brown was the caretaker of the British Seaman's Institute in Tarragona in Spain. He returned to England before the outbreak of the Spanish Civil War and later took up positions as clerk of works at various airfields that were being built.

Career statistics
Source:

References

1880 births
People from Lowestoft
English footballers
English Football League players
Association football wingers
Kirkley & Pakefield F.C. players
Dulwich Hamlet F.C. players
Arsenal F.C. players
Stoke City F.C. players
Norwich City F.C. players
Millwall F.C. players
Gainsborough Trinity F.C. players
Sheffield United F.C. players
Year of death missing